Wrexham Hibernians Football Club was a short-lived Welsh association football club based in Wrexham who played in the Welsh Cup during the 1890–91 season. They were nicknamed the Irishmen and were made up of people from the Irish diaspora. They were first mentioned in 1889 and last appeared in the local press in 1891. They played their home games off Bradley Road, Wrexham.

Cup History

References

Sport in Wrexham
Sport in Wrexham County Borough
Defunct football clubs in Wales
Football clubs in Wrexham
Irish diaspora sports clubs in the United Kingdom